
Nice (stylised as Nice.) is an album by Japanese pop group PUFFY, released in 2003 it is their third North American album. The US release featured a few track changes: "Atarashii hibi" and "Tomodachi" were replaced with "Urei", "Teen Titans Theme" and "Planet Tokyo", an English song with the melody of "Akai buranko".  The album peaked at No. 20 on the Japanese Albums Chart.

The introductory carrier melody of "K2G(Kimi Ni Go!)" was derived from the introductory interlude of the song "How Was It for You?" by James, from this English Postpunk/Britpop band's third album, Gold Mother (1990).

The cover art for the American version of the album is a homage to John Lennon and Yoko Ono's "bed-In" peace protests held in 1969.
The songs Planet Tokyo and K2G (Kimi Ni Go!) are featured in the Hi Hi Puffy AmiYumi World Tour Game and Teen Titans.

Track listing

Personnel
Puffy AmiYumi
Ami Onuki - vocals, harmony
Yumi Yoshimura - vocals, harmony

Additional personnel
Andy Sturmer - drums, guitar, drum programming, ARP synthesizer, Moog synthesizer, guitars, pipe organ, mellotron, percussion, vibraphone, keyboards, trumpet, marimba, bass, Prophet synthesizer, Fender Rhodes, vocal kazoo, claps, piano, acoustic guitar, ARP string ensemble, harmony, Vox Continental organ, BVO
John Fields - guitars, bass, piano, vocoder, Hammond organ B3, Roland Space Echo, chamberlin, Farfisa organ, strange echoes,
Wookie Von Crozier - crazy drum fill
Chris James - drums, Wurlitzer, synthesized blips and bleeps, toy piano, chamberlain
Printz Board - flugelhorn
Bleu - 12 string guitar
Dean Parks - banjo, acoustic guitar
Elizabeth Lea - trombone
The Horndogs - horns
James Childs - guitars
Phillip Broussard, Jr. - harmonies and chorus
Toishi Toshikazu - harmonies and chorus

Production
Producer: Andy Sturmer
Instrument recording: John Fields
Vocal recording: Thom Russo, John Fields
Mixing: Thom Russo, John Fields
Mastering: Kotetsu Tohru
Mastering assistants: Phillip Broussard, Jr., Ohno, Shiota Osamu, Hatagoshi Hideyasu
Musical instruments technician: Oba Toshimasa
A&R: June Shinozaki
Interpreter: Takamizawa Mai
Art direction: Central 67
Design: Central 67
Photography: Uchida Shoji
Hair and make-up: Shuma Tesuro
Styling: Miyajima Takahiro

References

Puffy AmiYumi albums
2003 albums